Ján Čarnota (born 8 June 1985) is a Slovak football defender. 

His brother Patrik Čarnota is also footballer.

References

External links
 at spartak.sk 

1986 births
Living people
Slovak footballers
Association football defenders
MFK Dolný Kubín players
MFK Ružomberok players
FC Spartak Trnava players
MFK Zemplín Michalovce players
SFC Opava players
Slovak Super Liga players
Expatriate footballers in the Czech Republic
People from Stará Ľubovňa
Sportspeople from the Prešov Region